Eunephrops cadenasi, sometimes called the sculptured lobster, is a species of lobster found in the Caribbean.

Description
Eunephrops cadenasi is a medium-sized lobster with a cylindrical body. The first three pairs of legs bear claws, of which the first pair are enlarged.

Distribution
The natural range of Eunephrops cadenasi extends from the seas off the Bahamas and Dominica southwards to Jamaica and Colombia.

Taxonomic history
The specific epithet cadenasi commemorates José Manuel Cadenas y Aguilera, Rector of the University of Havana.

References

True lobsters
Crustaceans of the Atlantic Ocean
Crustaceans described in 1939